Charles Woolley Bage  (1751–1822) was an English architect, born in a Quaker family in Derby, Derbyshire, in the United Kingdom.  He was the designer of the first ever iron framed building, the Ditherington Flax Mill, located in the outskirts of Shrewsbury town centre, built between 1796 and 1797. He not only built the first but also the 3rd and 8th steel framed buildings in the world.

Shortly after his birth, his family moved to Elford, Staffordshire, where his father founded a papermill, later becoming a partner in an ironworks.  Throughout his life, Bage took an interest in the application of iron and gas technologies in construction and lighting, respectively.  Bage was also a novelist.

By 1776, Bage was working as a wine merchant in Shrewsbury, and also as a surveyor, the latter being of interest to John Marshall and Thomas and Benjamin Benyon, who intended to develop mills in the town.

Bage had involvement in the local political affairs of Shrewsbury: he was in charge of the local workhouse from 1784 to 1787, and later was the town's mayor in 1807. The technology that Bage developed makes him a pioneer of what would become modern sky scraper technology.

"Bage Way", part of Shrewsbury's 20th century inner ring road which links Old Potts Way to Crowmere Road, was named for him.

References

1751 births
1822 deaths
18th-century English architects
Architects from Derby
Mayors of places in Shropshire
People from Elford